Actinus imperialis is a beetle of family Staphylinidae and subfamily Staphylininae.

Description
This colorful staphylinid has very large jaws, metallic green head and pronotum, a strongly convex and punctured pronotum, purplish elytra that are rugose-punctate, an abdomen narrowed posteriorly, and reddish testaceous legs. This beetle has been reported on Cardamom and usually preys on flies attracted to carrion and dung.

Distribution
This species occurs in Papua New Guinea and in Australia's Cape York Peninsula.

References
 Biolib

External links
 Australian Rainforest
 Tolweb

Staphylininae
Insects of New Guinea
Beetles described in 1878